The Dame Malvina Major Foundation was established in 1991.

The Foundation fundraises as a charitable trust and offers a range of support and scholarships and prizes to emerging New Zealanders in performing arts.  It has regional committees in Auckland, Waikato, Taranaki, Wellington, Christchurch and Dunedin. The Foundation has many volunteers who support the running of it. Malvina Major is a world-renowned New Zealand soprano.

One programme they offer is with New Zealand Opera. In 2022 the recipients of this studio programme were: Katherine Winiata, Emmanuel Fonoti-Fuimaono and Hannah Ashford-Beck. The foundation also provide prizes at the Lexus Song Quest singing competitions.

Dame Malvina Major Award 
A $50,000 award that started in 2020 and is funded by Hamilton thoroughbred horse breeder Joan Egan.

Award winners:

 Soprano - Natasha Te Rupe Wilson, 2021
 Tenor - Amitai Pati of Sol3 Mio, 2020

Scholarships

Ryman Healthcare DMMF Mina Foley Award 
Mina Foley was a New Zealand soprano who 'rose to fame' in the 1950s.

Award winners are:

 Ana James 2008
 Wendy Dawn Thompson 2009
 Wade Kernot 2010
 Andrew Glover 2011
 Anna Leese 2012
 Shaun Dixon 2013
 Madeleine Pierard 2014
 Rachelle Pike 2015
 James Benjamin Rodgers 2016
 Jonathan Abernethy 2017
 Amelia Berry 2018
 Holly Mathieson 2019
 Amitai Pati 2020
 Bianca Andrew 2021

DMMF Scholarship in association with the New Zealand Opera School 
This scholarship is awarded to a student of the New Zealand Opera School.

 Emmanuel Fonoti-Fuimaono 2022

Cecily Maccoll High Achiever Award – Canterbury 
This award is a legacy of Cecily Maccoll and is granted as part of the Christchurch Arts Excellence Awards.

 Soprano - Aivale Cole 2012
 Cellist - Catherine Kwak 2013
 Tenor - Harry Grigg 2014
 UC Christchurch Youth Orchestra 2015
 The Herzog Klaviertrio 2016
 Flautist - Matthew Lee 2017
 Baritone - Angus Simmons 2018
 Conductor - Daniel Cooper 2019
 Violinist - Thomas Bedggood 2020
 Violinist - Rose Light 2021

Alice Cole Piano Scholarship - Auckland/Waikato 
The scholarship is a legacy of Alice Cole for piano students between the ages of 14 and 21 in the Auckland and Waikato regions.

 Lawrence Wong 2010
 Sylvia Chen 2011
 Jason Bae 2012
 Lucy Zeng 2013
 Arnold Lee 2015Leon Chen 2016
 Tony Chen 2017
 Siyu Sun 2018
 Ashani Waidyatillake and Jessica Chi 2019
 Sunny Lee, runner up Audrey Guo 2020
 It has been postponed during 2021 and 2022 Covid-19 health measures

Peter Lees-Jeffries Memorial Scholarship 
Peter Lees-Jeffries was a Christchurch theatrical designer and teacher. This scholarship is for $2500 for professional development. It is not awarded every year.

 Hedda Oosterhoff 2009
 Andrew McKenzie 2010
 Jessica Verryt 2012
 Kate Middleton-Olliver 2015
 Jacqueline Coats, opera director 2018
 Abigail Boyle, ballet dancer 2019
 Antonia Kamu, director 2021

Maxwell Fernie Dame Malvina Major Foundation Award 
The award honours Maxwell Fernie and is for a young keyboard artist to further their education or training.

 William McElwee 2021

Italian for New Zealand Opera Singers Masterclasses 
A scholarship to attend Italian for NZ Opera Singers Masterclasses in Italy run by Patricia Hurley.

 Carleen Ebbs, Claire Egan, Tavis Gravatt 2012
 Moses Mackay, Polly Ott 2013
 Christie Cook, Daniel O’Connor, Julien Van Mellaerts 2014
 Madison Nonoa, Jarvis Dams 2015
 Eliza Boom, Katherine McIndoe, Kieran Rayner, Oliver Sewell 2016
 Natasha Wilson, Marlena Devoe, Jonathan Eyers 2017
 Joanna Foote, Elisabeth Harris, Harry Grigg, Ben Reason 2018
 Pasquale Orchard, Joel Amosa, Stephen Diaz, Timothy Carpenter 2019

Sir Howard Morrison Vocal Scholarship 
This scholarship has ceased. It was run by Sir Owen Glenn and The Glenn Family Trust in collaboration with the Dame Malvina Major Foundation in recognition of Howard Morrison. for a New Zealand performer aged between 16 and 32 years of age. The final year of the scholarship was in 2019.

 Te Waikamihi Korohina-Ormsby 2010
 Amina Edris 2012, 2011
 Oriana Kershaw 2013, 2014
 Madison Nonoa, Jarvis Dams, Joel Amosa 2015
 Blaire White 2016
 Pasquale Orchard 2018
 Hannah Bryant 2019

Aria Prizes

Lockwood New Zealand Aria 
This is a $20,000 first prize held annually in Rotorua.

First Prize Winners

 Julia Booth 2008
 Pene Pati 2009
 Amelia Berry 2010
 Stacey Alleaume 2011
 Stephen Diaz 2012
 James Ioelu 2013
 Isabella Moore 2014
 Amitai Pati 2015
 Frederick Jones 2016
 Jarvis Dams 2017
 Manase Latu 2018
 Elizabeth Mandeno 2019

Dame Malvina Major Foundation Christchurch Aria 
First Prize Winners

 Maia Vegar 2013
 Isabella Moore 2014
 Madison Nonoa 2015
 Elisabeth Harris 2016
 Eliza Boom 2017
 Laura Loach 2018
 Anna Simmons (1st), Olivia Sheat (2nd) 2019
 Erica Paterson 2021

Dame Malvina Major Foundation Waikato Conservatorium of Music Aria 
University of Waikato Conservatorium of Music

2018 - First prize: Katie Trigg, Second prize: Taylor Wallbank, Third prize: Calla Knudson-Hollebon

2019 - First prize: Aidan Phillips, Second prize: Alfred Fuimaono, Third prize: Tayla Alexander

2021 - First prize: Emmanuel Fonoti Fuimaono and Alfred Fonoti-Fuimaono Third prize: Jordan Fonoti-Fuimaono

Dame Malvina Major Foundation Wellington Aria First Prize Winners 

 Amelia Berry 2009
 Bryony Williams 2010
 Daniela-Rosa Young 2011
 Isabella Moore 2012
 Christie Cook 2013
 Christian Thurston 2014
 Katherine McIndoe 2015
 Frederick Jones 2016
 Madison Nonoa 2017
 Will King 2018
 Sophie Sparrow 2019

Dame Malvina Major Foundation Dunedin Aria First Prize Winners 

 Christie Cook 2013
 Isabella Moore 2014
 Eliza Boom 2015
 Filipe Manu 2016
 Natasha Wilson 2017
 Olivia Pike 2018
 Laura Loach 2019

Dame Malvina Major Foundation Second Prize Winners ODT Aria Contest 

 Julien Van Mellaerts 2009
 Julien Van Mellaerts 2010
 Kawiti Waetford 2011
 Grace Park 2012

Dame Malvina Major Foundation Napier Aria First Prize Winners 

 Natasha Wilson 2018
 Manase Latu 2019

North Shore Becroft Aria Second Prize Winners 

 Will King 2018
 Christina McDonald 2019

References 

New Zealand music awards
Opera in New Zealand